Hansi, is a city and municipal council in Hisar district in the Indian state of Haryana. It appears that at one time Hansi was larger, more prosperous and more important than Hisar. The town has several important buildings of archeological importance.

In 2016, the Haryana government put forward a proposal to carve the new Hansi district out of the Hisar district.

History
It is believed that Hansi was founded by King Anangpal Vihangpal Tomar for his guru "Hansakar" (957 AD). Later, the son of King Anangpal Tomar, Drupad established a sword manufacturing factory in this fort, hence it is also called "Asigarh". Swords from this fort were exported as far away as to Arab countries. As per Talif-e-Tajkara-e-Hansi by Qazi Sharif Husain in 1915, around 80 forts across the area were controlled from this centre "Asigarh".

A few also say that it was founded by ill daughter Hansivati/Ambavati of Prithvi Raj Chauhan though there exists no proof of Prithiviraj's daughter by that name.

Hansi hoard, a large hoard of Jaina bronzes was accidentally discovered at Hansi in February 1982. These include idols that may belong to the Gupta period (319 to 605 CE), while most belonged to the 7th–8th centuries. They were apparently buried underground before the impending attack by Mahmud of Ghazni's son Mas'ud I of Ghazni in 1037 CE. Masud attacked swordsmen of Hansi and took women into slavery who were later sold at Gazni.

In 1192, after the defeat of Prithvi Raj Chauhan by Mohammed Gauri, Hindu rule ended in Hansi. This was the time when non-Muslims were not permitted to settle here. Slowly, Hansi lost its importance and was remembered only as a fort. Delhi started becoming the center of attention.

Hansi is listed in the Ain-i-Akbari as a pargana under Hisar sarkar, producing a revenue of 5,434,438 dams for the imperial treasury and supplying a force of 7000 infantry and 500 cavalry. It had a brick fort at the time.

Shahjahan came to Hansi, met the famous Hindu saint Jagannath Puri Samadha Hansi and after his approval Hindus were allowed to settle in Hansi. In addition to the Hindus, Hansi had Muslims and a few Jains that inhabited Hansi during this Mughal rule.

Jagannath Puri Samadha has also many devotees because of their belief that Jagannath Puri was not a common human being but a supreme being. There are many famous stories of Jagannath Puri like a walkable wall, sweat lotus, and so on.

Sikh and Maratha rule 
The Marathas captured Hansi area in 1778, who tried to establish a state for some time in this Area until Hansi fell to the Sikh Empire, and established a Sikh Empire rule under Jind State.

British colonial rule 
The area came under British rule after 1803 till 1947. After the Indian Rebellion of 1857, the British empire crushed over 100 people from Rohnat, Mangali, Hazampur, Jamalpur, Bhatla and other villages under a road roller on the road as punishment for participating in the mutiny. That road is now known as Lal Sadak md Altaph Ansari (literally Red Road or Blood Road) where a monument, on approach road from Hansi to Rohnat Lal Sadak, to the martyrs has been constructed after the independence.

Guru Gobind Singh also came to Hansi in 1705 and inspired the public to revolt against Mughal rule. In 1707, Baba Banda Singh Bahadur attacked Hansi. Hansi was under Maratha rule in 1736 and, after Third Battle of Panipat in 1761, was lost to Ahmed Shah Abdali. Maharaja Jassa Singh Ramgarhia in 1780s also took this area under his control for some years and then left.

George Thomas, an Irish mercenary and raider who rose from an ordinary sailor to become a feudal lord (jagirdar), made Hansi as his capital. Hansi was seized by the British East India Company rule in 1802. From 1819–32, Hansi was a District HQ which was later shifted to Hisar in 1832.

Hansi was also the headquarters of Colonel James Skinner CB (1778 – 4 December 1841) the Anglo-Indian immigrant and mercenary in India, who became known as Sikandar Sahib. 1st Skinner's Horse and 3rd Skinner's Horse (formerly 2nd Skinner's Horse) were founded by Colonel James Skinner at Hansi in 1803. These units are still part of the Indian Army. He also built the Sheikhpura Kothi, on Hansi-Ugalan road off NH9 Hansi bypass, named after his son.

Raham Ali ibn Mohammad Hussain ibn Maulana Abul Khair of Palwal was killed along with Aulia Khan Balooch at Pargana Hansi. Raham Ali was brother-in-law of Qazi Syed Mohammad Rafi.

After the Anglo-Maratha Wars, Hansi came under British rule. Hansi took active part in the 1857 war of liberation (Gadar), Lala Hukam Chand Jain was martyred in 1857 by Britishers.

In 1947 when British India was divided into Pakistan and India, a large number of Muslims including Syeds and Ranghars migrated to Pakistan from Hansi city and their villages (such as Baliali and Khanak). Pakistani cricket player Inzamam-ul-Haq's parents migrated to Pakistan from Hansi after partition.

Sites of the City

Dr. Bhup Singh, historian, has written Hansi ka Etias, a History of Hansi, a book published by Rotary International. He has also written two other books and has been linked to a number of local social organisations.

Hansi is known for its famous sweet peda which is made from milk and is sent to many other towns and cities for retail selling. Many hansi street food is famous in linked cities. There are many famous stories about Hansi city like buried gold in hansi, lal sadak and Jagannath Puri samadha.

Barsi gate
The city of Hansi has five gates of entry – Delhi Gate (East), Hisar Gate (West), Gosain Gate (North-west), Barsi Gate (South) and Umra Gate (South west). The peculiarity of this town is that its altitude increases after entry from any of the gates. Deserts guard this city towards its west (cities like Tosham, Devsar, Khanak).

Another prominent feature of this ancient city is its fort.

During the period of Firoz Shan Tuglaq about 1302, a tunnel was constructed connecting the present Hansi to Hisar. The gate of fort has figures of gods, and pictures of gods, goddesses, birds can also be seen on the walls of the fort. The entry gate of the fort was built by George Thomas. This fort was declared a Protected Monument of National Importance in 1937 by the Archeological Survey, the present ASI, and is still in good condition, a must visit site for all archeologists.

Jain and Buddhist heritage
Right in front of the Fort, ancient statues of "Jain God" Mahavira and "Founder of Buddhism" Gautama Buddha are placed. These statues are worth $1 million as calculated by the Archeologists.

Geography
It has an average elevation of 207 metres (679 ft) People Density is 348 people per km^2 .Area is 1272.32 km^2. Geographically, it is semi-arid with around 46 cm of annual rainfall.

Many roads in Hansi city have been broken for years and have not been developed well yet. Every year many roads break because of heavy vehicles, rain, and other factors. When you travel to Hansi city you may not find a proper road after entering the city. The city is full of cattle . You will enjoy many free cattle on the roadside view but beware of them. The city is really beautiful and so many linked cities and villages.

Demographics
As per census of India data, Hansi had a population of 75,730 in 2001, which rose to 86,770 by 2011,and in 2020 its becomes about 443098. In 2011, female sex ratio was 883 per 1000 men and female child sex ratio was 830. In 2011, Hansi had an average literacy rate of 81.06% (68% in 2001), higher than the state average of 75.5%, male literacy is 86.59% (73% in 2001), and female literacy is 74.84% (61% in 2001). In Hansi, 11.41% of the population is under 6 years of age.

Religion
In 2011, 96.77% of residents are Hindus, 1.34% Jain, 0.99% Sikhs, 0.05% Buddhist, 0.66% Muslim, 0.10% Christian and 0.10% unstated.

City

Tehsil

SD Higher Secondary School, Hansi

Colleges
 Nehru Memorial Government College, Hansi
 S.D. Mahila Mahavidyalaya, Hansi

iti
 S. D. Higher Secondary School, Hansi

See also
 Asigarh Fort
 Hisar
 Hisar division
 Jamal-ud-Din Hansvi

References

External links
 Barsi Gate, Umra Gate, Hansi

Cities and towns in Hisar district
Hisar (city)